Dichogaster is a genus of annelids belonging to the family Acanthodrilidae.

The species of this genus are found in Southern America, Africa and Eastern Asia.

Species:

Dichogaster spec

References

Annelids